The following railroads operate in the U.S. state of Nevada.

Current railroads

Common freight carriers 
 BNSF Railway (BNSF)' Union Pacific Railroad (UP)

 Private freight carriers 
 Nevada Industrial Switch (PGFX)
 Savage Rail (SVGX)

 Passenger carriers 
 Amtrak (AMTK): California Zephyr Las Vegas Monorail
 Mandalay Bay Tram
 Nevada Northern Railway Museum (NN)
 Nevada Southern Railway
 Nevada State Railroad Museum
 Virginia and Truckee Railroad
 Railroad Contractors 
 Gabriel Willaman Railroad Construction

 Defunct railroads 

 Private 

 Austin City Railway
 Bluestone Mining and Smelting Company
 Bristol Silver Mines Company
 Carson and Tahoe Lumber and Fluming Company
 Crystal Bay Railroad
 Dayton, Sutro and Carson Valley Railroad
 Golconda and Adelaide Railroad
 Goldfield Consolidated Milling and Transportation Company
 Goldfield Consolidated Mines Company
 Kennecott Utah Copper Corporation
 Lake Tahoe Narrow Gauge Railroad
 Pacific Portland Cement Company
 Prince Consolidated Mining Company
 Quartette Mining Company
 Sierra Nevada Wood and Lumber Company
 Six Companies, Inc.
 Sutro Tunnel Railroad
 Verdi Lumber Company
 Yellow Pine Mining Company

See also
Streetcars in Reno

 Notes 

 References 
 Association of American Railroads (2003), Railroad Service in Nevada'' (PDF). Retrieved May 11, 2005.
 

Nevada
 
 
Railroads